Heartcore is Kurt Rosenwinkel's fifth album as a band leader. The album was fully produced by Rosenwinkel and Q-Tip of popular hip-hop group A Tribe Called Quest.  The album is a departure musically from Rosenwinkel's previous work, as he contributes keyboard, drums, and voice, at times creating soundscapes completely on his own in his personal studio.  Says Rosenwinkel, "There is a place, musically, that’s above the categories.  This record – it’s jazz. And it’s much more".  While much of the album features varied instrumentation and personnel, a few tracks rely on a live performance aspect, reminding the listener of the connection to the jazz tradition.  Rosenwinkel cites the influence of Arnold Schoenberg in the harmonic textural construction on Heartcore.

Track listing
 "Heartcore" – 8:39
 "Blue Line" – 6:11
 "All the Way to Rajasthan" – 6:59
 "Your Vision" – 8:36
 "Interlude" – 2:45
 "Our Secret World" – 6:13
 "Dream/Memory?" – 3:26
 "Love in the Modern World" – 8:15
 "dcba//>>" – 7:52
 "Thought About You" – 5:44
 "Tone Poem" (Rosenwinkel, Nathan Street, Ben Street) – 3:07

Personnel

Kurt Rosenwinkel – Guitar, Keyboards, Drums, Programming
Mark Turner – Tenor Saxophone (1, 2, 6, 9), Bass Clarinet (11)
Ben Street – Bass (2, 3, 6, 8, 11)
Jeff Ballard – Drums (2, 3, 6, 9, 11)

With:
Ethan Iverson – Piano (9), Keyboards (6)
Andrew D'Angelo - Bass clarinet (4)
Mariano Gil - Flute (5, 8)

References

External links 
Heartcore at Verve Records

2003 albums
Albums produced by Q-Tip (musician)
Kurt Rosenwinkel albums